Adrian Charles Buckmaster, 4th Viscount Buckmaster (born 2 February 1949) is a British peer and businessman.

Early life
The son of the Hon Colin John Buckmaster, a son of the 2nd Viscount, by his marriage to May Gibbon, Buckmaster was educated at Charterhouse School, Godalming, and Clare College, Cambridge, graduating in 1970 with a Bachelor of Arts degree and proceeding to Master of Arts in 1974.

Career
Buckmaster has been Chief Executive Officer of Avecia Group PLC since October 2005 and also serves as Chief Executive Officer of Automotive Products Group Ltd. He has been a Director of Avecia Group since May 2006 and also serves as a Director of Avecia Holdings PLC.

Family
He married Elizabeth Mary Mark, daughter of Norman Mark, on 26 July 1975 and has a son and two daughters;
 Hon. Clare May Buckmaster b. 1979
 Hon. Andrew Nicholas Buckmaster b. 1980
 Hon. Nicola Mary Buckmaster b. 1986

Interests
Buckmaster is a Trustee of the Clare College Boat Club.

References

1949 births
Living people
People educated at Charterhouse School
Alumni of Clare College, Cambridge
Viscounts in the Peerage of the United Kingdom
20th-century English businesspeople
21st-century English businesspeople